The Honduras Fed Cup team represents Honduras in Fed Cup tennis competition and are governed by the Federación Hondurena de Tenis. They have not competed since 2018.

History
Honduras competed in its first Fed Cup in 2007, finishing eighth in Group II.

Current Team
 Sofia Barletta
 Marisela Aviles
 Zulema Zelaya
 Maria de los Angeles Cardenas

See also
Fed Cup
Honduras Davis Cup team
Aviles

External links

Billie Jean King Cup teams
Fed Cup
Fed Cup